Canada East was one of two national representative rugby union teams from Canada that competed in the North America 4 Series. When the North America 4 was replaced by the Canadian Rugby Championship and Americas Rugby Championship in 2009, Canada East ceased to exist.

History

Formation
Canada East was founded in 2005 by the NA4 Committee.  The NA4 Committee is made up of the International Rugby Board, Rugby Canada and USA Rugby.  The committee was charged with operating and financing the four North American teams (the others being the USA Hawks, USA Falcons, and Canada West.  By 2008, however, each franchise was to be sold and become privately owned.

Inaugural competition
East's first ever match occurred on 20 May 2006 during the inaugural NA 4 Series. They faced the USA Falcons in pool play and were defeated 14–29. They finished the competition with a 2–2–1 record in pool play and had an average of 27 points scored and 22 points scored against per match. Derek Daypuck of the Castaway Wanderers captained the squad during the inaugural campaign.

PARMA Select XV
The PARMA Select XV is the All-Star squad composed of the best players of the competition as determined by the Pan-American Rugby Media Association.  Dan Pletch, Stu Ault, Sean-Michael Stephen, and Derek Daypuck were selected to the starting XV.  Jarod Selby was named as a reserve.

External links
Official Site

References

Canadian rugby union teams
North America 4 teams
Rugby union teams in Nova Scotia